The 2019 African Handball Super Cup (25th edition), also known as Babacar Fall Super Cup, in honour of the first chairman of the African Handball Confederation, was a handball competition organized by the African Handball Confederation, under the auspices of the International Handball Federation, the handball sport governing body. The matches, held on 4 April 2019 at the Salle Omnisport Al Inbiâat, in Oudja, Morocco, were contested by Zamalek, the 2018 African Handball Champions League winner and Al Ahly, the 2018 African Handball Cup Winners' Cup winner, on the man's side and Clube Desportivo Primeiro de Agosto, the 2018 African Women's Handball Champions League winner and Petro de Luanda, the 2018 African Women's Handball Cup Winners' Cup winner. Zamalek, on the man's side and Primeiro de Agosto, on the woman's side, were the winners.

The winners qualified to the 2019 IHF Super Globe.

2019 Africa Men's Handball Super Cup

2019 Africa Women's Handball Super Cup

Awards

See also
 2019 African Handball Champions League
 2019 African Women's Handball Champions League
 2019 African Handball Cup Winners' Cup
 2019 African Women's Handball Cup Winners' Cup

References

External links
 Official website

Africa Handball Super Cup
Africa Handball Super Cup
African Handball Super Cup
International handball competitions hosted by Morocco
African Handball Super Cup
African Handball Super Cup